Kieron Assiratti (born 30 June 1997) is a Welsh rugby union player who plays for Cardiff Rugby as a prop. He is a Wales under-20 international.

Assiratti made his debut for the Cardiff in 2017 having previously played for the Cardiff academy.

In August 2020 it was confirmed Assiratti had joined Premieship Rugby side Bristol Bears on a short-term loan for the remainder of the 2019–20 season.

References

External links 
Cardiff Blues profile

Rugby union players from Rhondda Cynon Taf
Welsh rugby union players
Cardiff Rugby players
Living people
1997 births
Rugby union props
Bristol Bears players